Here is an overview of the teams which took part at the 2001 Rugby World Cup Sevens.

Pool A

Coach:  Rupeni Ravonu
Rupeni Caucaunibuca
Vilimoni Delasau
Fero Lasagavibau
Sailosi Naiteqe
Taniela Qauqau
Senerisi Raque
Waisale Serevi
Jope Tuikabe
Josefa Uluvida
Marika Vunibaka

Coach:  Gonzalo Albarracín
Diego Albanese (Grenoble)
Pedro Baraldi (Jockey Club Rosario)
Felipe Contepomi (Bristol)
Ignacio Corleto (Narbonne)
Martín Gaitán (CA San Isidro)
Francisco Leonelli (La Tablada)
José María Núñez Piossek (Huirapuca)
Santiago Phelan (CA San Isidro)
Agustín Pichot (Bristol)
Hernán Senillosa (Hindu Club)

Coach:  Yoo Jung-Hyeom
Choi Han-Sik
Chun Jong-Man
Kim Hyung-Ki
Kim Jae-Hyun
Lee Jin-Wook
Park Chang-Min
Park Noh-Young
Sung Hae-Kyung
Yong Hwan-Myung
Yoo Min-Suk

Coaches:  Jimmy Stonehouse and  Nikolay Nerush
Andrey Evdokimov
Vyacheslav Grachaev
Viktor Yakolev
Andrey Kuzin
Viktor Motorin
Konstantin Rachkov
Alexey Sergeev
Andrey Sorokin
Vitaly Sorokin
Murat Uanbayev

Coach: Denis McBride
Jan Cunningham
Andrew Dunne
James Ferris
Derek Hegarty
Aidan Kearney
Aiden McCullen
Conor McPhillips
Matt Mostyn
David Quinlan
James Topping

Coach:William Githinji
Kenneth Aswani
Benjamin Ayimba
Stephen Gitonga
Alan Hicks
Paul Murunga
Felix Ochieng
Peter Ocholla
Anthony Ongoro
Oscar Osir Osula
Allan Wamanga

Pool B

Coach: Norman Mbiko
Chester Williams
Wayne van Heerden
Helgard Brink
Ricardo Loubscher
André Pretorius
Bob Skinstad
Rodger Smith
Paul Treu
Breyton Paulse
Warren Britz

Coach:Thierry Janeczek
Jérôme Troader
Mathieu Lièvremont
Jean-Victor Bertrand
Luc Lafforge
Sébastien Viars
Franck Corrihons
Michel Marfaing
Jean-Marc Souverbie
Farid Sid
Lionel Mallier

Coach: Nigel Booker
Aaron Enoka
Amosa Amosa
Conrad Piri
Chrysmane Mokoroa
Teuvira Uea
Teokotai Tua'ivi
Lance Fitzpatrick
Kiliana Samania
Terry Piri
Darren Robson

Coach: Ric Suggitt
Fred Asselin
Gregor Dixon
Jesse Frender
Andrew Hoffmann
Mark Irvine
Nick Milan
Winston Stanley
Jeff Williams
Morgan Williams
Nik Witkowski

Coach: Malkhaz Cheishvili
Vasil Abashidze
Giorgi Bugianashvili
Paliko Jimsheladze
Bessik Khamashuridze
Vasil Katsadze
Archil Kavtarashvili
Gia Labadze
Malkhaz Urjukashvili
Tedo Zibzibadze
Badri Khekhelashvili

Coach:Mao Cheng-Wu
Chang Chun-Wei
Chang Wei-Cheng
Chen Chen-Fu
Chen Chai-Hsin
Lin Fu-Long
Pan Chin-Min
Wang Kuo-Feng
Wu Chin-Hsien
Wu Chin-Wei
Yeh Teng-Yuan

Pool C

Coach: Gordon Tietjens
Rodney So'oialo
Eric Rush
Jared Going
Karl Te Nana
Amasio Valence
Brad Fleming
Jonah Lomu
Mils Muliaina
Craig Newby
Roger Randle

Coach: Adrian Thompson
Kris Chesney
Ben Johnston
Grant Seely
Joe Worsley
Paul Sampson
Mike Friday
Nigel Simpson
Josh Lewsey
Paul Sackey
Rob Thirlby

Coach: Paulo Nawalu
Kensuke Iwabuchi
Hajime Kiso
Toru Kurihara
Ryohei Miki
Daisuke Ohata
Shinji Ono
Scott Pierce
Masanao Washiya
Takeomi Ito
Kiyonori Tanaka

Coach: Francisco Puertas Soto
Carlos Souto - Oviedo
Oscar Astarloa - Saint-Jean-de-Luz
Fernando Díez - CR Liceo Francés
Oriol Ripol - UE Santboiana
Alberto Socías - CR Valencia
Ferran Velazco - UE Santboiana
Steve Tuineau - UE Santboiana
José Ignacio Inchausti - Moraleja Alcobendas Rugby Union
Álvar Enciso -  CR El Salvador
Miguel Ángel Frechilla - Valladolid RAC
Jorge Prieto - Ciencias CR

Coach:Andy Ferreira
Charlton McNab
John Ewing
Mordechai Mwerenga
Leon Greef
Ryan Bekker
Jeff Tigere
Victor Olonga
Karl Mudzamba
Tafadzwa Manyimo
Antony Papenfus

Coach: Elías Santillán
Edmundo Olfos
Nicolas Arancibia
Diego Durruty
Sebastian Pinto
Roberto Infante
Bernardo Garcia
Cristobal Berti
Sebastian Garcia
Andrea Erlandsen
Cristian Gonzalez

Pool D

Coach: Filipo Saena
Tim Cowley
Gaolo Elisara
Ron Fanuatanu
Daniel Farani
Ailaoa Samania
Toa Samania
Semo Sititi
Steven So'oialo
Luke Mealamu
Tanner Vili

Coach: Glen Ella
Scott Barton
Ed Carter
Tim Donnelly
Richard Graham
Julian Huxley
Matt Isaac
Robert McDonald
Sam Payne
Cameron Pither
Brendan Williams

Coach: Colin Hillman
Jason Forster
Jamie Ringer
Will Thomas
Gareth Baber
Luke Richards
Andy Marinos
Emyr Lewis
Gareth Wyatt
Shane Williams
Andy Williams

Coach: Evan Crawford
Antonio Mauricio de Aguilar
Antonio Ferreira Pinto
Rohan Hoffmann
Antonio Da Cunha
José Maria Vilar Gomes
Miguel Portela
Alfredo Simoes
Pedro Murinello
Miguel Barbosa
Frederico Sousa

Coach: Jim Rowark
Cristopher Gordon (HKFC)
Will Wild (HKFC)
Hamish Bowden (HKFC)
Ricky Cheuk Ming Yin (DLA)
Carl Murray (Valley)
Matthew Reede (HKFC)
Warren Warner (HKFC)
Roderick Dickson (HKFC)
Mark Solomon (DLA)
Paul Dingley (Valley)

Coach: John McKittrick
Craig Sim
Chip Curtis
Malakai Delai
Dave DiSorbo
Mose Timoteo
Alex Magleby
Jovesa Naivalu
Jason Raven
Don Yonger
Matt Kane

References

RWC7s 2001 Squads
2001 Rugby World Cup Sevens teams at World Rugby

Rugby World Cup Sevens squads